Mount Prospect Baptist Church is a historic church at 339 W. Black Street in Rock Hill, South Carolina.

It was built in 1915 and added to the National Register in 1992.

References

Baptist churches in South Carolina
Churches on the National Register of Historic Places in South Carolina
Churches completed in 1915
20th-century Baptist churches in the United States
National Register of Historic Places in Rock Hill, South Carolina
Buildings and structures in Rock Hill, South Carolina
Churches in York County, South Carolina